At least two ships of the Royal Norwegian Navy have been named HNoMS Oslo, after the city of Oslo:

, a  destroyer purchased from the Royal Navy in 1946 and broken up in 1968.
, an  launched in 1964 and wrecked in 1994.

Royal Norwegian Navy ship names